Arnold Steinhardt (born 1937 in Los Angeles, California) is an American violinist, best known as the first violinist of the Guarneri String Quartet.

Steinhardt made his debut with the Los Angeles Philharmonic Orchestra at the age of 14. He studied at the Curtis Institute of Music in Philadelphia with Ivan Galamian and later in Switzerland with Joseph Szigeti and Toscha Seidel. In 1958 he won the Leventritt International Violin competition and consequently was invited by George Szell to take second chair in the Cleveland Orchestra's first violin section (next to concertmaster Josef Gingold). He was later appointed to the faculty of the Curtis Institute, Rutgers, the State University of New Jersey, and University of Maryland. In 2009 he was appointed to the faculty of the Colburn School in Los Angeles. He has also performed extensively as a soloist.

He lives in Santa Fe, New Mexico, and is the author of two books; Indivisible by Four: A String Quartet in Pursuit of Harmony, an account of his life in the Guarneri String Quartet, and Violin Dreams, an autobiography about his life and experiences as a violinist. He appeared as himself in the 1999 film Music of the Heart, starring Meryl Streep and also featuring violinists Isaac Stern and Itzhak Perlman. His wife, Dorothea von Haeften, is a supporting character in the film, played by Jane Leeves.

Arnold Steinhardt received an honorary degree from Binghamton University.

Works
 Steinhardt, Arnold, Violin Dreams, Houghton Mifflin, 2006, 
 Steinhardt, Arnold, Indivisible by Four: A String Quartet in Pursuit of Harmony, Farrar Straus Giroux, 1999,

References

External links
 Official website of Arnold Steinhardt
 In The Key of Strawberry, Official blog of Arnold Steinhardt
 
 KBAQ interview with Arnold Steinhardt January 6, 2005
 Artist-in-Residence bio at the University of Maryland

1937 births
Living people
American male violinists
Curtis Institute of Music alumni
American classical violinists
Male classical violinists
Jewish classical violinists
Jewish American classical musicians
Prize-winners of the Queen Elisabeth Competition
Leventritt Award winners
Musicians from Los Angeles
Classical musicians from California
21st-century classical violinists
21st-century American male musicians
Guarneri Quartet members
21st-century American Jews
21st-century American violinists